Papua New Guinean Australians are the citizens and residents of Australia (including the Torres Strait Islands, where 6.5% of all people claimed Papua New Guinean ancestry) who were born in Papua New Guinea (PNG) or have Papua New Guinean ancestry.

Papua New Guinea was administered by Australia until 1975, formally divided into the Territory of Papua and the Territory of New Guinea (a League of Nations mandate). The indigenous peoples of Papua New Guinea were nonetheless subject to the White Australia policy, and only limited numbers were allowed to enter the rest of Australia – notably to work in the Queensland pearling industry.

The number of Papua New Guineans in Australia is considered relatively small, given the countries are neighbours and PNG's status as a former Australian territory. Other Pacific island countries have much larger populations in Australia. At the time of the 2021 Australian census, there were 22,664 people of Papua New Guinean descent in Australia and 29,995 Papua New Guinea-born people residing in the country. The gap between the two figures reflects the fact that many of those born in PNG were the children of Australian expatriates; only 8,752 (less than one-third) of Australian residents born in PNG reported that they were of Papua New Guinean ancestry.

The highest number of people reporting Papua New Guinean ancestry live in the tropical city of Cairns in Far North Queensland, which is reflected in a similar climate to PNG, influence of Torres Strait and Melanesian cultures as well as direct flights between Cairns and Port Moresby.

Notable PNG-Australians

See also

 Papuan people
 Australia–Papua New Guinea relations

References

Oceanian Australian
 
Papua New Guinean diaspora